Vinod Babu (born 20 May 1968) is an international cricket umpire based in Oman.

On 20 January 2019,  Babu stood in his first Twenty20 International (T20I) match, in the fixture between Maldives and Kuwait in the 2019 ACC Western Region T20 tournament. On 6 January 2020, Vinod stood in his first One Day International (ODI) match, in fixture of the 2020 Oman Tri-Nation Series, between Namibia and the United Arab Emirates.

See also 
 List of One Day International cricket umpires
 List of Twenty20 International cricket umpires

References

External links 
 

1968 births
Living people
Omani One Day International cricket umpires
Omani Twenty20 International cricket umpires
Indian expatriates in Oman